The lordship of Bouillon was in the 10th and 11th century one of the core holdings of the Ardennes–Bouillon dynasty, and appears to have been their original patrimonial possession.

The Bouillon estate was a collection of fiefs, allodial land, and other rights. The collection included e.g. the allod villages of Bellevaux, Mogimont, Senseruth, and Assenois, the advocacy of the monastery of Saint-Hubert and Ardennes, and the land to the south of Bouillon, formerly the land of the abbey of Mouzon, now held as a fief of the Archbishop of Reims.

During the 10th and 11th century, the lords of Bouillon also held, for shorter or longer periods, the Duchy of Lower Lorraine, county of Verdun, margraviate of Antwerp, along with many lesser titles.

List of the lords of Bouillon

 It is difficult to draw an exact list of the lords of Bouillon, as the lordship did not automatically follow the better documented ducal and comital titles held by the dynasty.

 Since Bouillon is believed to be the patrimonial possession of the dynasty, one would believe the lordship was inherited by the oldest son. Based on this assumption, one can set up a tentative list of the Lords of Bouillon: Godfrey the Captive (?, possibly until abt. 1002)
 Frederick, son of above, (?, possibly abt. 1002-1005)
 Godfrey the Childless, younger brother of Frederick, (?, probably 1005-1023)
 Gozelo, younger brother of Frederick and Godfrey, (1023-1044)
 Godfrey the Bearded, son of above, (1044-1069)
 Godfrey the Hunchback, son of above, (1069-1076)
 Godfrey the Crusader, nephew of Godfrey the Hunchback, (1076-1096)

 sold to the Prince-Bishopric of Liège''

See also

Duke of Bouillon

Notes

References 

Lists of French nobility
Lists of German nobility
Lists of nobility of the Holy Roman Empire
Lists of Dutch nobility
Lists of Belgian nobility
Lists of nobility of Luxembourg
 
People from Bouillon